Shane Jennings (born 14 January 2001) is an Irish rugby union player, currently playing for United Rugby Championship and European Rugby Champions Cup side Connacht. His preferred position is centre.

National team
Jennings represents the Ireland national rugby sevens team on the World Rugby Sevens Series. He debuted for the national sevens team in 2021.

Early life
Jennings was born in Ballinasloe, County Galway. He attended Garbally College. Jennings has played for Ballinasloe RFC and Garbally College. Shane won an All Ireland minor medal with Galway in 2018 and earning the man of the match award for his display in the final in Croke Park.

References

External links
itsrugby.co.uk Profile

2001 births
Living people
Irish rugby union players
Connacht Rugby players
Rugby union centres
Ireland international rugby sevens players
People from Ballinasloe